The University of North Texas Press (or UNT Press), founded in 1987, is a university press that is part of the University of North Texas. It is a member of the Association of University Presses, to which it was admitted in 2003. The University of North Texas is also a member of Texas A&M University Press's Texas Book Consortium program.

Publications 
Major publications released by the University of North Texas Press include the following:

Notable book series 

 "A. C. Greene" series
 Al Filo: Mexican American Studies", edited by Roberto R. Calderón
 "Katherine Anne Porter Prize in Short Fiction"
 "Publications of the Texas Folklore Society", edited by the Texas Folklore Society
 "Southwestern Nature Writing Series", edited by David Taylor
 "Vassar Miller Prize in Poetry"

Journals 

 Journal of Schenkerian Studies  journal specializing in Schenkerian analysis of music
 Theoria  journal specializing in music theory and analysis

See also

 List of English-language book publishing companies
 List of university presses

References

External links

Press
North Texas, University of
1987 establishments in Texas
Publishing companies established in 1987
Press